Guildford Hockey Club is a field hockey club based on the grounds of Broadwater School in Godalming, Surrey.

The club runs eleven men's and seven women's league teams including veterans sides and also runs junior teams. After winning both women's and men's South East Premier Divisions in 2021-22, the clubs first XIs will play in Conference East of the women's and men's national league in 2022-23.

The club was established in 1912 and has secured some major national honours throughout its history.

National Honours

Men's
 1977-78 Men's Cup Champions
 1979-80 Men's Cup Runner-Up
 1994-95 Men's Cup Champions
 2000-01 Men's Cup Champions
 2000-01 Men's Premiership Tournament Runner Up

Junior
 2018-19 Boys' Under 18 Tier 1 Cup Winners
 2021-22 Boys' Under 16 Tier 1 Cup Winners

Masters
 2021-22 Women's Over 45 Tier 2 Cup Winners

Men's International players past and present

References

 
English field hockey clubs
Field hockey clubs established in 1912
1912 establishments in England
Sport in Guildford